Jerónimo Domín Funes (9 January 1576 – 23 April 1650) was a Roman Catholic prelate who served as Bishop of Gaeta (1636–1650).

Biography
Jerónimo Domín Funes was born in Calatayud, Spain and ordained a priest in the Order of Our Lady of Mount Carmel.
On 30 December 1636, he was selected as Bishop of Gaeta and confirmed by Pope Urban VIII on 14 December 1637.
On 21 December 1637, he was consecrated bishop by Gil Carrillo de Albornoz, Cardinal-Priest of Santa Maria in Via, with Diego Requeséns, Titular Archbishop of Cartagine, and Biago Proto de Rubeis, Archbishop of Messina, serving as co-consecrators. 
He served as Bishop of Gaeta until his death on 23 April 1650.

While bishop, he was the principal consecrator of Jacobus Wemmers, Titular Bishop of Memphis (1645).

References

External links and additional sources
 (for Chronology of Bishops) 
 (for Chronology of Bishops) 

17th-century Italian Roman Catholic bishops
Bishops appointed by Pope Urban VIII
1576 births
1650 deaths
Carmelite bishops